Visible light imaging is an imaging modality that uses visible light.

In Medicine

Standardization and Adoption
Even prior to specific support in DICOM for visible light imaging, the standard could already encapsulate color images, e.g., in JPEG format as Secondary Capture images

. The need for standardized communication of digital visible light images from various specialties, and the need for specialty-specific acquisition context metadata and an appropriate controlled terminology

was recognized

not long after the DICOM standard was introduced and the terminology of visible light imaging was introduced to the standard

.
The United States Department of Veterans Affairs was an early adopter of a standardized approach to incorporating visible light images into the electronic medical record

.
Increasingly, visible light imaging is being deployed beyond individual departments, as part of a trend referred to as Enterprise Imaging

.

Applicability

Endoscopy
Including fiberoptic endoscopy and rigid scope endoscopy:
 angioscopy
 arthroscopy
 bronchoscopy
 colposcopy
 cystoscopy
 fetoscopy
 hysteroscopy
 gastrointestinal endoscopy including esophagogastroduodenoscopy and colonoscopy
 laparoscopy
 nasopharyngoscopy
 sinoscopy

Microscopy
Including:
 Light microscopy for anatomic pathology, e.g., transmission light microscopy and reflection light microscopy for cytology and histology
 Surgical microscopy, e.g., images produced by an operating microscope used in:
 cardiothoracic surgery
 general surgery
 neurologic surgery
 obstetrics and gynecology
 ophthalmic surgery
 oral surgery and maxillofacial surgery
 orthopedic surgery
 otorhinolaryngology
 pediatric surgery
 plastic surgery
 urology
 vascular surgery

Photography
General anatomic photography, including:
 anatomic pathology
 dermatology
 dentistry
 forensic pathology
 ophthalmology, including retinal fundoscopy
 aesthetic (cosmetic) and reconstructive plastic surgery
 general medical photography

See also

 DICOM
 Digital Photography
 Enterprise imaging
 Picture archiving and communication system

References

Medical imaging